Pat Phelan (born January 16, 1985 in Houston, Texas) is an American soccer player.

Career

Youth and College
Phelan grew up in Enfield, Connecticut, and attended Wilbraham & Monson Academy, where he was named the 2003 Gatorade National High School Player of the Year. He also played club soccer for the Oakwood Soccer Club.  He played college soccer for Wake Forest University, where he was a double major in political science and Spanish. He was named to the 2004 ACC All-Freshmen Team, the 2005 Top Drawer Soccer 2nd All-America team, the 2005 NSCAA All-Region Team, and 2007 ACC First Team. He was an NSCAA First Team All American in 2007 and captained the Wake Forest Demon Deacons to their first NCAA Division 1 National Championship.

Professional
Phelan was drafted in the first round (10th overall) of the 2008 MLS SuperDraft by Toronto FC but did not make a first team start before being traded to New England Revolution on June 4, 2008. In return, Toronto received use of an international roster spot through the end of the 2010 season. He made his MLS debut Revolution, on June 12, 2008, against Houston Dynamo.

On August 7, 2010, Phelan scored his first career goal against D.C. United on a header from a long pass from teammate Chris Tierney. The Revolution ended up winning the game, by a score of 1-0, thanks to Phelan's goal.

Signed with SJK of the Ykkönen in May 2012.

After one season in Finland, Phelan returned to the United States when he signed for NASL club San Antonio Scorpions on March 1, 2013.

After one season with the San Antonio Scorpions, despite several international offers, Phelan elected to retire from professional football and pursue a career in Financial Planning.  He now resides on Cape Cod with his family and works for New York Life.

International
Phelan played for the USA Under-18, Under-20, and Under 23 national teams, and was part of the squad for the 2005 FIFA World Youth Championship. He was named the Most Valuable Player of 2002 Talence International Tournament in Talence, France, and competed in the Northern Ireland Milk Cup in 2003 and 2004.

Personal 
Phelan married Maggie Reddington on January 10, 2009, in Chatham, Massachusetts. His parents are Tom and Phyllis Phelan, of Enfield, Connecticut. He has a sister named Grace. He is the cousin of Gerard Phelan, the recipient of Doug Flutie's famed Hail Mary Pass versus Miami on November 23, 1984.

Honors

Wake Forest University
NCAA Men's Division I Soccer Championship (1): 2007

References

External links
 
 Wake Forest bio

1985 births
Living people
All-American men's college soccer players
American expatriate soccer players
American soccer players
Association football defenders
Association football midfielders
Association football utility players
Expatriate footballers in Finland
Major League Soccer players
New England Revolution players
North American Soccer League players
Parade High School All-Americans (boys' soccer)
People from Enfield, Connecticut
San Antonio Scorpions players
Seinäjoen Jalkapallokerho players
Soccer players from Connecticut
Sportspeople from Hartford County, Connecticut
Soccer players from Houston
Toronto FC draft picks
Toronto FC players
United States men's under-20 international soccer players
United States men's youth international soccer players
Wake Forest Demon Deacons men's soccer players
Wilbraham & Monson Academy alumni